Butler's Hill railway station was a former station on the Great Northern Railway's Nottingham to Shirebrook line.

The tram stop is situated on the alignment of the former Midland Railway route from Nottingham to Worksop, which is now shared between the NET and the Robin Hood railway line, but there was never a railway station at its location.

References

Disused railway stations in Nottinghamshire
Railway stations in Great Britain opened in 1882
Railway stations in Great Britain closed in 1932
Former Great Northern Railway stations
Ashfield District